The ancient kingdom of Armenia had 15 provinces. The provinces were called ashkharh, which means "world" in Armenian.

See also
Armenian Highland
Armenian Kingdom of Cilicia
Greater Armenia
Lesser Armenia
Hemşin
Armenian Mesopotamia
Kingdom of Armenia (disambiguation)

References

Literature 
Hewsen, Robert H.: Armenia: A historical Atlas. The University of Chicago Press. . 

Geography of Armenia